KXAD-LD is a digital low-powered television station that is licensed to and located in Amarillo, Texas. It is a Rev'n affiliate owned by Mako Communications. The station transmits its digital signal on UHF channel 51.

The current license is the digital successor to K64GK, which was a Multimedios Televisión affiliate in the 2000s.

References

External links

Low-power television stations in the United States
XAD-LD
Television channels and stations established in 2003
2003 establishments in Texas